The Waterloo mine is a large silver mine located in California.

See also 
List of mines in California

References 

Buildings and structures in San Bernardino County, California
Silver mines in the United States